MV Loch Linnhe is a Caledonian Maritime Assets Limited ro-ro car ferry, built in 1986 and operated by Caledonian MacBrayne After over ten years at Largs, she was the summer vessel on the Tobermory–Kilchoan crossing from 1999 to 2017.

History
MV Loch Linnhe was the second of four drive-through ferries built in the 1980s by Dunston's of Hessle, to cope with increasing traffic on CalMac's smaller routes.

Layout
They have a second passenger lounge, on the port side, reducing the capacity of the car deck to 12. The wheelhouse is painted red and given a black top, as she has no funnels as such.

Service
MV Loch Linnhe replaced  on the Lochaline–Fishnish crossing in July 1986. After one month, she moved to the

She has seen relief service at Raasay, Iona, Gigha, Eriskay, Fishnish, Lochaline, Lismore and Bute.

In Summer 2017, Loch Linnhe was displaced on the Tobermory to Kilchoan route by  owing to rising vehicle traffic on that route. Loch Linnhe became a spare/relief vessel.

References

Caledonian MacBrayne
1986 ships